is a Ryukyuan gusuku in Nanjō, Okinawa. It was built with Ryūkyūan limestone in the mid-14th century. It is now in ruins.

History
The castle was built in the Gusuku Period of Ryukyuan history. It was the home of the Aji of Tamagusuku Magiri. After Nanzan was conquered in 1429 by Shō Hashi, it came under the control of the Ryukyu Kingdom.

References

External links
On the castle, how to get there
 Itokazu Gusuku
 Itokazu Castle Remains by the Okinawa Film Office
 Itokazu Castle Ruins and Neishi Gusuku by Nanjo City
 Local Music Group, Okinawa Soundscape performing at Itokazu Castle

Castles in Okinawa Prefecture